The Little Crab (German: Der kleine Krebs) is a Modern Greek folktale translated and published by Greek folklorist  from a source in Siteia, in 1938.

The tale is related to the international cycle of the Animal as Bridegroom or The Search for the Lost Husband, in that a heroine marries a supernatural husband in animal shape, loses him, and has to seek him out. It is also classified in the international Aarne-Thompson-Uther Index as tale type 425B, "Son of the Witch", thus distantly related to the Graeco-Roman myth of Cupid and Psyche.

Source 
According to Megas, the tale was collected by M. Loudaki from a female teller named Urania Karantoni, from Seteios, Sitia, Crete.

Summary 
A widow lives with her three daughters, and they earn their living by gathering herbs in the mountains. One day, the youngest takes her basket next to a river and finds a little crab she takes with her to her house. The little crab comes out of the basket and lives with the woman until it grows larger and larger. One night, the widow has a dream about the crab ordering her to go to the king by sunset of the following day and ask for the king's daughter's hand in marriage for the crab. The woman wakes up and does not pay much attention to the contents of her dream. The following day, the crab appears to her and threatens to devour her if she does not go to the king's palace on the crab's orders.

After the threat, the widow goes to the palace and tells the king there is a crab in her house that wishes to marry the princess. The king then orders him to perform a task first: he has to build a palace unlike any other on Earth next to the kings. The crab summons all devils with a whistle and commands them to erect the palace. The next day, the king orders a second task: to build a garden with all types of trees and all birds that sing in the morning. The crab also fulfills the task. Lastly, the king orders the crab to have the sky above the city of golden colour. The next morning, the sky is indeed painted with golden colour. The king then concedes that the crab must be no ordinary person, and arranges his daughter's marriage to the crab. The husband-to-be arrives in a coach in the palace, and the princess, on seeing the crustacean, relents and marries him. She cries herself to sleep but wakes up when she sees a handsome youth next to her. She tries to push him away, but the youth explains he is the crab, changed to that shape by his mother so no maiden could marry him, and that she has to keep it secret, otherwise she must seek him out with iron shoes and an iron cane. The princess promises him to keep his secret.

However, eight days after the wedding, still during the festivities, the populace mocks her for marrying a crab, but, on hearing this, she tells them the crab shell is only his disguise and points to a youth as her husband. The crab flies in the air and vanishes. The princess, then, goes after him wearing two pairs of iron shoes and walking with an iron cane until she reaches a river. She stops to rest and wet some cookies on the river, but the stream is strong and carries her off to Drakäna's house, her mother-in-law.

The Drakäna takes her in and orders the princess to plant beans in the morning, harvest them in the afternoon, and cook her a meal after the Drakäna returns. The princess goes to cry near the river, where she hears a masculine voice asking for a kiss, but she declines the voice's offer. The son of the Drakäna, her husband, appears to her and advises her how to fulfill the task, and she must deny that she had help from her son, with the caveat that, if his mother mentions "your bitter death", the princess must reply with "my sweet death" (in reference to him).

The following day, the Drakäna says she wants the house swept and unswept, cooked and uncooked, and the waterjugs filled and unfilled. The same mysterious voice asks the princess for a kiss, which she declines, but advises her how to fulfill the second task: she is to place a trash heap in the middle of the room and sprinkle a bit over the house; then, she is to place the pan in the oven and let it be; and fill the waterjugs to the half. The princess follows the instructions and fulfills the task, but the Drakäna insists she had help.

The following day, the Drakäna says her son is to be married, and gives the princess two heaps of dirty clothes to be washed with a single bar of soap, and a piece of bread to feed her dog and her donkey with. The voice appears again and asks for a kiss, which the princess refuses, but tells her to go up the mountain and shout for the Neraidas of the mountain to come and wash the clothes, since the Drakäna's son is geting married. The princess takes the dog and the donkey with her up the mountain and summons the Neraidas; they come and wash the clothes, and give food for both animals.

The Drakäna comes back and sees that the tasks have been fulfilled, and orders the princess to fulfill twelve sacks with feathers, for she wants twelve pillows for her son's wedding guests. The mysterious male voice advises the princess to go to the woods and shout at the birds that the Drakäna's son is dead, and they will give her their feathers; once she has enough feathers, she is to dismiss them by saying she lied about his death.

The last task done, the Drakäna plans another way to devour the human girl: she orders the princess to go beyond another mountain where her sister, the witch, lives, and get from there violins and drums for the upcoming wedding. The Drakäna's son tells the princess this is a trap, and advises her to procceed: on the streets, she is to pluck a fig full of worms from a fig tree, eat it and compliment the tree; drink from a muddy and dirty spring and compliment it; cut of a rag of her dress and give to a woman cleaning an oven with her breasts; enter the witch's house and, while she is distracted sharpening her teeth, the princess is to get the instruments and escape. The princess follows the instructions to the letter and gets the instruments while the witch is at the kitchen, but she leaves and commands the woman at the oven, the spring and the fig tree to stop her, to no avail.

Finally, the Drakäna celebrates her son's wedding to another bride, and glues candles on the princess's fingers, so she illuminates the sleeping couple for the whole night, and burns to death while at it. The false bride enters the chamber and sees the princess. The Drakäna's son takes the candles from the princess's and places them on the false bride, who burns to death, while the pair escapes back to the princess's father's castle.

Analysis

Tale type 
Georgios A. Megas classified the tale as tale type AaTh 425A. In addition, Greek folktale scholars Anna Angelopoulou and Aigle Brouskou, editors of the Greek Folktale Catalogue, classified the tale as type AaTh 425A. In addition, the two folklorists follow Megas and treat subtype A as "Cupid and Psyche".

The Greek folklorists follow , who, in his monograph, indexed type 425A as the "oldest" of the "Animal as Bridegroom" subtypes. In the international index, however, Megas's and Swahn's typing is indexed as type ATU 425B, "The Son of the Witch".

Variants

Greece 
Richard MacGillivray Dawkins translated a Greek variant from the island of Karpathos, with the title Moskambari. In this tale, a poor girl lives with her starving mother. One day, she eats too much of their food and her mother curses her daughter to be eaten by an ogress. A wind blows the girl's kerchief to an ogress's house, who takes her in. The ogress orders the girl to do some tasks for her son's upcoming wedding. First, she has to clean forty rooms; then, to wash the ogress's son's clothes without soap and thirdly to stuff mattresses with feathers—all tasks done with help from Moskambari ("Musk and Amber"), the ogress's son. To fulfill the third task, Moskambari advises her to go up the mountain and shout at all the birds that Moskambari is dead, and they will give their feathers. Finally, the ogress sends the girl to her ogress sister to get fiddles for the wedding. Before the human girl goes to the ogress's sister's house, Moskambari gives her advice: she is to clip the long eyelashes from an old woman; eat a fig filled with worms and compliment the fig tree; step on thistles and compliment them; drink from a river filled with worms and compliment it; change the food of animals (chaff for the donkey, bones for the lion); enter the house, get the instruments and escape. At the ceremony, Moskambari chooses the girl instead of his bride-to-be, who is further humiliated by being made to fart in front of the ogress.

In a variant from the island of Lesbos collected from a Mersini by William Roger Paton with the title Melidoni ("Sorrow" or "Care"), a poor fisherman wants to marry his three daughters to suitable suitors. A cafezi advises him to pray to God and to cast his net in the sea. He marries his two elder daughters. When it is the youngest's turn, he catches a lobster in his net and gives it to his daughter as her husband. At first, the girl is sad, but the lobster reveals he is a prince and that the lobster is his ship ("kanani" in Modern Greek, similar to "kananida", a kind of lobster). He warns her not to tell anything to her family. One day, she visits her family and watches over the lobster skin. Meanwhile, she sees outside their house a prince (her husband) appear three times, each on a more splendid horse and garments than the later. On the third time he visits, she tells her family the prince is her lobster husband, and he disappears. She then wears three leather dresses, and three pairs of boots with iron soles, and goes on a quest for him. She meets three ogresses on the way, who help her and indicate the way to Melidoni. She meets a disguised Melidoni, who asks her for a kiss. She refuses and he turns her into a button, promising to take her to his mother. Once there, Melidoni changes her back and presents her to his mother. The ogress mother tells her to sweep and not sweep the floor of 40 rooms, to cook and not cook the meat for the ogress, and to fetch yeast from the house of the ogress's sister. She accomplishes it all with her husband's guidance.  Melidoni's mother betroths him to another bride and tells the girl to fill many mattresses with feathers, to make a donkey dance, to feed the dog, and to bring back a loaf of bread untouched. Finally, on the wedding day, the girl is forced to hold torches, bearing the pain of their burning, and—as her husband instructed the night before—throws them at the bride. They escape back to her father's house.

W. R. Paton collected another tale from Lesbos from informant Melsini Chistelli. In this tale, named The Eagle, a princess lives her life in a glass chamber. One day, she plays with a ball and breaks the walls of the glass chamber. An eagle flies in and kisses her. The princess goes after the bird and reaches a house in the woods, where an ogress lives. The ogress forces the girl to do three chores for her, under penalty of being devoured. The first task is to sweep and unsweep the house. A youth appears to the girl and offers his help in return for a kiss. The girl declines the offer, but he helps her anyway: she is to sweep the house and leave some heapings in every room. The youth also advises her that, when the witch suspects the girl was helped by the ogress's son Kakothanatos, the girl is to deny any help from Kalothanatos. The next tasks are to cook meat and leave it uncooked, and to fill a mattress with feathers from the sea. To fill the mattress, the youth tells her to summon all birds by shouting that their μαργιροντάκις is dead. (Paton also wrote that in a retelling, the same informant added a fourth task: to separate a heap of cereal grains, which the girl does by summoning the birds again). Lastly, the ogress sends the girl to her sister's house to get the toumpána troumána and the khartoproumvána. The eagle appears to her, tells her he is the son of the ogress, and advises her: she is to get to the ogress's sister's house, get a box from behind the staircase, and escape with it. The girl follows the instructions but opens the box and little devils escape. The eagle appears again and summons the devils back to the box with a whistle. At the end of the tale, the eagle says the ogress will make her choose a thing from the house, and she is to choose a dirty jackdaw (which is the eagle, in a new shape). The girl takes the jackdaw with her and it transforms into a prince.

In a variant collected by Greek folklorist  with the title Ο χρυσαετός του κόσμου ("The Golden Eagle of the World"), a married couple lives a happy life, until the wife is pressed by her neighbours to ask her husband's name. He says it is "Μαυροτάρταρο της Γης, το Χρυσαετό του Κόσμου" ('Black Tartaro of the Earth, the Golden Eagle of the World'). He vanishes overnight and the wife goes looking for him. She reaches his mother's (who is a dragon) house and is taken as a maid. The dragon forces the wife to sweep and not sweep the house, to cook and not cook a piece of lamb, and to go to the dragon's sister to get the "toumoula" and the "moumoula" and bring them back. Her husband advises her to change the donkey's and the dog's fodder on the way to the sister's house, complement a crooked fig tree and a river filled with dirty water, get the things, and escape. Finally, the dragon mother prepares her son's wedding to another bride and forces the human girl to wash her husband's clothes in the river and to hold  candles near the bridal bed.

In a Greek tale translated by literary critic  into French with the title Les souliers de fer ("The Iron Shoes"), a poor fisherman has three daughters and earns his living by catching fish in the sea. One day, he cannot catch any fish, and stops by a mountain. He sighs heavily, and the rock opens up to reveal a giant man, who questions the man why was summoned. The fisherman, scared at the strange man, denies having summoned him. The giant, then, invites the fisherman in for a talk and tells him he will provide the man with money, in exchange for one of the man's daughters as his bride. The fisherman's youngest daughter, Maricoula, is given to the giant as wife, and lives with him, her staying at home and weaving and him hunting during the days. Meanwhile, Maricoula's elder sister, envying her cadette's fortune, asks her father to take her there for a visit. The fisherman sighs "O" before the mountain and the giant appears to take them in. Maricoula's elder sister goes to talk to her little sister about her husband, and questions the latter her husband's true name. Maricoula answers that it is "O", but her sister says this is not a name, and advises her to ask his name that same night after they leave. Marcoula asks the giant his true name, but he inquires if she is more interested in his life or in his name. The girl answers: "his name", and the giant slowly sinks into the ground, until he says his name is Constantino and he disappears. A voice suddenly tells her she must search for him wearing three pairs of iron shoes. Maricoula mourns her loss for a time and commissions from a smith the iron shoes. Maricoula wears down the first pair of shoes until she reaches the edge of a forest, where a toothless old woman lives. The old woman advises the girl to continue on her journey until she reaches the old woman's sister, an ogress, which will be weaving in her home. The old woman gives her a jar of honey and some figs for her to tease the ogress until the latter swears on Constantino's name not to eat Maricoula. The girl follows her orders and reaches the ogress's house by wearing down the second pair of iron shoes. The ogress swears not to devour the girl and takes her in, but secretly reneges on her oath and plots to kill her by setting impossible tasks. First, the ogress orders the girl to bake her bread, but leave half unbaked; make the bed and leave half unmade, and wash do half of the dishes. Maricoula cries over the task, when she hears a male voice asking her for a kiss. She declines the voice's offer, wanting to be devourd by the ogress than kissing anyone but her husband, then procceeds to fulfill the tasks on her own. The following day, the ogress orders the human girl to go to the ogress's sister's house and get from there a music box for the ogress's son's upcoming wedding. Maricoula hears the voice again (which the story explains it is Constantino's, testing his wife) offering to fulfill the task for her in exchange for a kiss, but the girl declines once again. Despite the refusal, the voice explains his aunt is an even fierce ogress, and advises Maricoula how to procceed: she is to trade the fodder of two animals (vine leaves for a horse, bone for a dog), spy on the window if the aunt is asleep with her eyes open, say a blessing over the door, get the box and escape. Maricoula follows the voice's warnings and brings back the box, despite the ogress's sister commanding the door, the dog and the horse to stop her. Lastly, the ogress forces Maricoula to hold candles on her fingers and between her toes all night to illuminate the ogress's son and his bride in their chambers. The girl sees that the ogress's son is her husband Constantino, and begins to cry. Constantino approaches her and asks for a kiss, but she would rather burn alive than kiss him. Then, the bride, "black as a Moor", says she kissed a shoemaker's behind for a spoonful of rice. On hearing this, Constantino takes the candles from Maricoula and places them on the false bride (who burns to death), kills his ogress mother and takes his human wife back to their mountain abode.

Cyprus 

In a Cypriot tale titled "Ο γιος του Περπέρογλου" ("The Son of Perperoglu"), and translated to Hungarian as Perperoglu fia ("The Son of Perperoglu"), a king has three thrones on which he sits according to his mood: a golden one if he is happy, and a copper one if he is worried. His three daughters see him on the copper throne and inquire about his mood. He tells them he received a letter to join in the war, and curses the fact that he has no sons. His youngest daughter, Theodora, agrees to take his place in the war with a masculine disguise, "Theodoros". Theodora, or Theodoros, reaches another city, where she lodges with the son of Perperoglu, whose mother is a drakaina. The son somehow sees through Theodora's disguise, although his mother dismisses her son's fanciful notion. Either way, the drakaina convinces her son to put Theodoros through some tests to see his true gender: choose to pick between sweet and bitter fruits; to pick up a sack of flour in the basement; and to sleep next to roses enchanted to ascertain her identity. With the help of her little dog, Theodora passes through the tests and Perperoglu's son is convinced he is truly a man. Theodoros goes to the war then returns to write a goodbye letter, where she confesses she is a girl named Theodora, then leaves to her father's kingdom. Seeing that she was humiliated, the drakaina tells her son to go to the Mount of Olives, summon all birds, and chop down four trees. He delivers four pieces of wood to his mother, who fashions a frame and tells him to sell it to Theodora's father. Theodora is given the frame and the next morning wakes up in the drakaina's house. The drakaina forces the girl to perform tasks: first, to fill a jar with her tears, then to wash and not wash, dry and not dry, iron and not iron a pile of clothes. The drakaina's son offers to help her for a kiss; she declines, but he still advises her. Next, she is to take a letter to the drakaina's sister and ask for a sieve. The son knows it is a trap, so he advises Theodora to get the sieve and flee, then throw behind her a bar of soap and a comb that he gives her to deter his aunt's rampage. She follows the instructions and delivers the sieve. The fourth task is to use flour, sift and not sift it, ferment and not ferment it, to bake some bread for her. The son advises her through it. The fifth task is for Theodora to deliver a letter to the drakaina's other sister to ask for her box and flute. The drakaina's son advises her to drink from a river of pus and blood, eat bitter and rotten apples from a tree, give hay to a donkey in the barn, stand two fallen doors, get the flute and the box and escape. Theodora follows his advice to the letter and escapes, even though the drakaina's sister commands the doors, the donkey, the apple tree and the river to stop the girl. Lastly, on a Sunday, the drakaina lights up a candle on each of Theodora's fingers, which burn as the candles melt. The drakaina's son offers to release her in exchange for a kiss. Theodora kisses him and both escape to her father's kingdom, where they marry. Anna Angelopulou and Aigle Broskou listed it as Cypriot variant of type AaTh 425A in the Greek Folktale Catalogue.

See also 
 The Golden Crab
 Prince Crawfish (Belarusian folktale)

References 

Greek fairy tales
ATU 400-459